Semeniškiai may refer to the following places in Lithuania:

Semeniškiai, Panevėžys
Semeniškiai, Vilnius